Ship grounding or ship stranding is the impact of a ship on seabed or
waterway side.  It may be intentional, as in beaching to land crew or cargo, and careening, for maintenance or repair, or unintentional, as in a marine accident. In accidental cases, it is commonly referred to as "running aground".

When unintentional, grounding may result simply in stranding, with or without damage to the submerged part of the ship's hull.  Breach of the hull may lead to significant flooding, which in the absence of containment in watertight bulkheads may substantially compromise the ship's structural integrity, stability, and safety.

As hazard
Severe grounding applies extreme loads upon ship structures. In less severe accidents, it might result only in damage to the hull; however, in most serious accidents, it might lead to hull breaches, cargo spills, total loss of the vessel, and, in the worst cases, human casualties.

Grounding accounts for about one-third of commercial ship accidents, and ranks second in frequency, after ship-on-ship collision. Grounding accidents are being studied in many international ports with serious concerns, e.g. Chittagong Port in Bangladesh.

Causes
Among the causes of unintentional grounding are:

Current 
Darkness 
Tide 
Visibility 
Waves 
Wind 
Depth of waterway 
Geometry of waterway 
Age of vessel 
Size of vessel 
Type of vessel 
Speed 
Human and organizational factors 
War, terror attack, and piracy

Recovery

When accidental grounding occurs, the ship or its cargo, will need to be removed if possible. This is done for various reason:
 The grounded ship remains seaworthy so the ship is removed in order to be repaired and return to service
 A stranded ship is an unsightly image of the area
 A stranded ship causes significantly stress on its structure and will eventually become a shipwreck if not properly dealt with
 The ship contains hazardous material and causes environmental damage if the material is to be released, which will eventually happen if stranded long enough
 A ship might be removed to prevent unauthorized entry into the ship by locals
 The grounded ship is a navigation hazard or otherwise obstructs a shipping route

See also

 2009 USS Port Royal grounding
 2021 Suez Canal obstruction
Amoco Cadiz
 Beaching (nautical)
 Costa Concordia disaster
 Exxon Valdez oil spill
 MS Riverdance
 MV World Discoverer
 Rena grounding and oil spill
 Spectacle Reef Light
 SS American Star
 SS Torrey Canyon
 SS Suevic

References

Maritime incidents